United Nations Security Council Resolution 1988, adopted unanimously on June 17, 2011, after recalling resolutions 1267 (1999), 1333 (2000), 1363 (2001), 1373 (2001), 1390 (2002), 1452 (2002), 1455 (2003), 1526 (2004), 1566 (2004), 1617 (2005), 1624 (2005), 1699 (2006), 1730 (2006), 1735 (2006), 1822 (2008) and 1904 (2009) on terrorism and the threat to Afghanistan, the Council imposed separate sanctions regimes on Al-Qaeda and the Taliban. 

Resolution 1988 dealt with sanctions relating to the Taliban, while Resolution 1989 (2011) addressed sanctions on Al-Qaeda. Until the passing of both the resolutions, sanctions on the Taliban and Al-Qaeda had been handled by the same committee.

Details
The Security Council reaffirmed that the situation in Afghanistan continued to constitute a threat to international peace and security. The provisions of the resolution, adopted under Chapter VII of the United Nations Charter, included; 

 A new sanctions regime targeting the Taliban and associates;
 Afghan-Taliban individuals listed under the list of sanctioned individuals created after Resolution 1267 were moved to the new sanctions list created by the current resolution;
 A new "Afghanistan Sanctions Committee" was established to oversee the implementation of the sanctions;
 The new Committee was to lift sanctions against former Taliban members who had renounced violence and joined the reconciliation process;
 The Afghan government was to send a list to the Committee of individuals it felt could be delisted;
 The new sanctions regime was to be transparent and sanctions had to be enforced fairly.

The annex of the resolution provided instructions for the new Committee.

See also
 Al-Qaida and Taliban Sanctions Committee
 List of United Nations Security Council Resolutions 1901 to 2000 (2009 – 2011)
 Terrorism

References

External links
Text of the Resolution at undocs.org
Security Council Committee established by Resolution 1988

 1988
United Nations Security Council sanctions regimes
Al-Qaeda
Taliban
 1988
2011 in Afghanistan
 1988
June 2011 events